Ambrosiy Anzorovych Chachua (born 2 April 1994) is a Ukrainian professional football defender who plays for Karpaty Lviv.

Career
Chachua is a product of FC Veres Rivne and of the UFK Lviv School Systems. His first trainer was Yaroslav Dmytrasevych. He made his debut for FC Karpaty entering in the second time in the match against FC Chornomorets Odesa on 3 November 2013 in the Ukrainian Premier League.

He also played for the Ukrainian under-18 national football team and was called up for other age level representations.

Honours
Torpedo Kutaisi
 Georgian Super Cup: 2019

References

External links

1994 births
Living people
Ukrainian footballers
Ukrainian expatriate footballers
FC Karpaty Lviv players
Ukrainian Premier League players
Ukrainian First League players
Ukrainian Second League players
Sportspeople from Rivne
FC Akzhayik players
Expatriate footballers in Kazakhstan
Ukrainian expatriate sportspeople in Kazakhstan
Kazakhstan Premier League players
Expatriate footballers in Georgia (country)
Ukrainian expatriate sportspeople in Georgia (country)
FC Torpedo Kutaisi players
Erovnuli Liga players
Association football defenders
FC Volyn Lutsk players
Ukraine youth international footballers
Ukraine under-21 international footballers